The Bad River LaPointe Band of the Lake Superior Tribe of Chippewa Indians or Bad River Tribe for short are a federally recognized tribe of Ojibwe people. The tribe had 6,945 members as of 2010. The reservation population was 1,545 in 2020. Most of the reservation is managed as undeveloped forest and wetland, providing a habitat for wild rice and other natural resources.

History 

According to Anishinaabe prophecy, Gichi Manidoo, the Great Spirit, told the Anishinaabe people to move west from the Atlantic coast until they found the "food that grows on water." After a series of stops and divisions, the branch of Anishinaabe known as the Lake Superior Chippewa found wild rice near the Chequamegon Bay on the south shore of Lake Superior, at the site of the present-day Bad River Lapointe Reservation. They made their final stopping place at nearby Madeline Island.

After the 17th century, Anishinaabe people settled throughout northern Wisconsin into lands formerly disputed with the Dakota Sioux and the Meskwaki. Those that remained near the trading post of La Pointe on Madeline Island were known collectively as the La Pointe Band; they engaged in the fur trade with neighboring French-Canadian settlers. They also pursued other seasonal occupations such as fishing, ricing, and hunting by men, and berry-picking, harvesting maple sugar, and gathering nuts, roots and medicinal plants by women.

After a disastrous attempt at removing the Lake Superior Bands in the 19th century, which resulted in the Sandy Lake Tragedy, the U.S. government agreed to set up permanent reservations in Wisconsin. At this point, the La Pointe band split: members who had converted to Roman Catholicism were led by Kechewaishke (Chief Buffalo) and took a reservation at Red Cliff. Those who maintained traditional Midewiwin beliefs settled at Bad River. The two bands, however, maintain close relations to this day.

The reservation land was set aside for the Bad River Lapointe Band in the Treaty of La Pointe, made with the United States and signed on Madeline Island on September 30, 1854. The treaty land included almost  on Madeline Island, which is considered the center of the Ojibwe Nation. The band is one of six Ojibwe bands in present-day Wisconsin and one of eleven federally recognized tribes in the state.

During the late 19th century, the Franciscan Sisters of Perpetual Adoration set up St. Mary's School in Odanah, an Indian boarding school. Students came from a variety of tribes to learn English and western topics, as well as Christianity. During this period, timber companies on the reservation leased land for lumbering, but they cheated the tribe of their leasing fees and destroyed much of the land by overlogging. During the Allotment period, the tribe leased almost half its land base, which originally covered all the area of modern-day Ashland, Wisconsin.

Revival of sovereignty

As Lake Superior Ojibwe, the Bad River Lapointe Band retains its rights to hunt, fish, and gather wild rice, and medicinal plants within the ceded territory of northern Wisconsin, Michigan, and Minnesota. The tribe pressed these claims throughout the 20th century. Tribal members from Bad River and the other Lake Superior bands resumed their traditional practice of spear fishing, resulting in the Wisconsin Walleye War with recreational and sports fishermen.

In 1996, a group of Ojibwe activists known as the Anishinaabe Ogitchida blocked a railroad shipment of sulfuric acid from crossing the reservation; it was destined for a copper mine in Michigan. The protestors complained the acid posed an environmental danger to reservation lands and the Lake Superior watershed. The national attention brought by the protests forced the Environmental Protection Agency to stop the use of acid in the copper mine.

The headquarters of the Great Lakes Indian Fish & Wildlife Commission (GLIFWC) is on the Bad River Reservation. The tribe also owns and operates a fish hatchery, which stocks local rivers and lakes with 15 million walleye annually.

The Bad River Band Of Lapoint Ojibwe own and operate a casino on the reservation, as well as the Moccasin Trail gas station and grocery store complex. The Tribe also runs a clinic, local transit, tribal school, daycare, and Head Start, as well as a police and volunteer fire department for its people. It has several community facilities: a tribal fire hall and youth center in the Birch Hill community, and a utility garage in the Franks Field community.

In 2014, the Tribe announced it will not renew the lease of 18 non-native people's land lease on Madeline Island, known as the Amnicon Bay Association.  The 50-year lease, which began in 1967, ended in August 2017.

The Mashkiiziibii Natural Resources Department´s task is to facilitate “the development of institutions of tribal self-governance to ensure the continued sovereignty of the Bad River Tribe in the regulation and management of its natural resources”. and has responded to numerous threats posed by Enbridge Line 5 pipeline.

Reservation 
The Bad River Reservation is primarily located on the south shore of Lake Superior and is nearly entirely covered by a forest and swamps. The reservation also includes a small area on the eastern tip of Madeline Island. Bad River is the largest Ojibwe reservation in Wisconsin and the second largest Indian reservation in the state, after the Menominee Indian Reservation. In Anishinaabemowin, they called the Anishinaabe people who lived around swamps Omashkiigowag ("Swampy people"), from mashkiig meaning "swamp". The people also go by Mashkigonaabeg, which means "Swampy-men:, where the suffix -naabe is "male" or "man" in the Anishinaabe language.

Geography
According to the U.S. Census Bureau, the reservation has a total area of 197.09 square miles (510.46km2), of which 193.11 square miles (500.16km2) is land and 3.98 square miles (10.3km2) is water. Less than 50% of the reservation land was tribally-owned as of 2010, with the remainder owned by individually by tribal members and outside purchasers due to historic allotment under the Dawes Act.

 of the reservation are high-quality wetlands due to the Kakagon Sloughs and Bad River sloughs; they are registered by the United States government as wetlands of international importance under the Ramsar Convention. The wetlands are ideal for the cultivation of wild rice, the historical crop of the Ojibwe. The sloughs constitute the only remaining extensive coastal wild rice marsh in the Great Lakes region. Due to its habitat and proximity to Madeline Island, Bad River is of major importance to the Ojibwe Nation. People from all over Ojibwe Country come for the annual August Celebration of the manoomin, or wild rice harvest.

Scattered across the reservation are many small lakes.

Reservation demographics
As of the census of 2020, the population of the Bad River Reservation was 1,545. The racial makeup of the reservation was 76.1% Native American, 19.4% White, 0.3% Black or African American, 0.1% Pacific Islander, 0.1% from other races, and 4.0% from two or more races. Ethnically, the population was 4.3% Hispanic or Latino of any race.

Most people on the reservation live in one of four communities: Odanah (including New Odanah), Diaperville (also called Old Odanah), Birch Hill, or Frank's Field/Aspen Estates.

According  to the American Community Survey estimates for 2016-2020, the median income for a household in the reservation was $51,458, and the median income for a family was $62,083. Male full-time workers had a median income of $36,389 versus $36,346 for female workers. The per capita income for the reservation was $22,694. About 13.0% of families and 21.1% of the population were below the poverty line, including 29.1% of those under age 18 and 15.0% of those age 65 or over. Of the population age 25 and over, 84.5% were high school graduates or higher and 11.7% had a bachelor's degree or higher.

Climate 

Bad River Reservation has extreme climate conditions. Winters are long and cold, while summers are short and warm. The climate is largely affected by Lake Superior. Low temperatures during the cold winter months tend to average slightly above . High temperatures during the cold winter months average above . Average low temperatures during the summer months are near . Precipitation is significant as a result of the extensive forest and Lake Superior.

Notable members 
 Lyle Mitchell Corbine Jr., filmmaker

See also
Great Lakes Indian Fish & Wildlife Commission

Further reading

References

External links 

Bad River Band of the Lake Superior Tribe of Chippewa Indians, official website
Great Lakes Intertribal Council description

Oklevueha Seminole

 
Ojibwe in the United States
Ojibwe governments
Native American tribes in Wisconsin
Native American history of Wisconsin
Federally recognized tribes in the United States
Ashland County, Wisconsin
Iron County, Wisconsin